Defending champion Yui Kamiji defeated Diede de Groot in the final, 2–6, 6–0, 6–2 to win the women's singles wheelchair tennis title at the 2018 French Open. It was de Groot's only loss at the majors that year, preventing her from achieving the Grand Slam.

Seeds

Draw

Finals

References
 Draw

Wheelchair Women's Singles
French Open, 2018 Women's Singles